Ingrid Wigernæs  (née Løken on 22 February 1928) is a retired Norwegian cross country skier who won a silver medal in the 3 × 5 km relay at the 1966 World Championships. She competed in the 5 km and 10 km events at the 1956 and 1964 Winter Olympics with the best result of 12th place in 1964.

Cross-country skiing results

Olympic Games

World Championships
 1 medal – (1 silver)

References

1928 births
Living people
Cross-country skiers at the 1956 Winter Olympics
Cross-country skiers at the 1964 Winter Olympics
Olympic cross-country skiers of Norway
FIS Nordic World Ski Championships medalists in cross-country skiing
Norwegian female cross-country skiers
People from Hemsedal
Sportspeople from Viken (county)